Obrad Tomić (born April 8, 1993) is a Bosnian professional basketball player for Rapla KK. He also represents the Bosnia and Herzegovina national basketball team internationally.

Professional career
Obrad Tomić started his career with Zrinjski in the Basketball Championship of Bosnia and Herzegovina. He also played for the Mladost Mrkonjić Grad and Kakanj, also in the Bosnian League.

On July 12, 2017, Tomić signed a three-year contract with Partizan Belgrade. He left Partizan in July 2018.

On August 13, 2017, Tomić signed a contract with Rogaška. Rogaška part ways with him on February 7, 2019.

National team career
Tomić represents the Bosnia and Herzegovina national basketball team at the 2019 FIBA Basketball World Cup qualification. On 19 August 2017, Tomić led his team to an 83–66 win in Yerevan over Armenia in with 16 points and 4 rebounds and also led the team to the Second round of qualification for FIBA World Cup 2019.

References

External links 
Profile at eurobasket.com
Profile at basketball.realgm.com

1993 births
Living people
ABA League players
Basketball League of Serbia players
Bosnia and Herzegovina men's basketball players
Bosnia and Herzegovina expatriate basketball people in Serbia
KK Kakanj players
KK Partizan players
OKK Sloboda Tuzla players
PBC Academic players
People from Trebinje
Serbs of Bosnia and Herzegovina
Centers (basketball)
Expatriate basketball people in Estonia